Magnet is a URI scheme that defines the format of magnet links, a de facto standard for identifying files (URN) by their content, via cryptographic hash value rather than by their location.

Although magnet links can be used in a number of contexts, they are particularly useful in peer-to-peer file sharing networks because they allow resources to be referred to without the need for a continuously available host, and can be generated by anyone who already has the file, without the need for a central authority to issue them. This makes them popular for use as "guaranteed" search terms within the file sharing community where anyone can distribute a magnet link to ensure that the resource retrieved by that link is the one intended, regardless of how it is retrieved.

History 
The standard for Magnet URIs was developed by Bitzi in 2002, partly as a "vendor- and project-neutral generalization" of the ed2k: and freenet: URI schemes used by eDonkey2000 and Freenet, respectively, and attempts to follow official IETF URI standards as closely as possible. BitTorrent introduced the btmh: protocol in 2020 as part of its BitTorrent v2 changes.

Format 
Magnet URIs consist of a series of one or more parameters, the order of which is not significant, formatted in the same way as query strings that ordinarily terminate HTTP URLs.

The following parameters are supported:

The standard also allows for application-specific experimental parameters, which must begin with "x".

Exact Topic (xt) 
The xt parameter specifies the URN for a given p2p protocol. Its purpose is to provide a search parameter for finding the metadata to the torrent. This effectively acts as a replacement to a .torrent file, which itself contains the torrent metadata, by instead searching the p2p network (using the URN) for that metadata. Each protocol handles a URN uniquely; for example, xt=urn:btih:FFC7E738EAA4CD4ECF51EC6FD669C6CDE2C281A8 uses the btih (BitTorrent v1 protocol), so a BitTorrent client can take the hash and lookup the torrent's metadata in the BitTorrent DHT. In the case of DHT the client searches through a set of pre-known nodes and requests the metadata for an infohash; those nodes will make the same request to other known nodes until eventually a swarm is found and returned.

xt also allows for a group setting. Multiple files can be included by adding a count number preceded by a dot (".") to each link parameter.
magnet:?xt.1=[ URN of the first file]&xt.2=[ URN of the second file]

 Tiger Tree Hash (TTH) These hashes are used on Direct Connect and G2 (Gnutella2), among others.
xt=urn:tree:tiger:[ TTH Hash (Base32) ]
 Secure Hash Algorithm 1 (SHA-1) These hash sums are used on gnutella and G2 (Gnutella2).
xt=urn:sha1:[ SHA-1 Hash (Base32) ]
 BitPrint Such hash sums consist of an SHA-1 Hash, followed by a TTH Hash, delimited by a point; they are used on gnutella and G2 (Gnutella2).
xt=urn:bitprint:[ SHA-1 Hash (Base32) ].[ TTH Hash (Base32) ]
 ED2K (eDonkey2000) hash These hash sums are used on eDonkey2000.
xt=urn:ed2k:[ ED2K Hash (Hex) ]
 Advanced Intelligent Corruption Handler (AICH) Not formal URNs for Magnet links, such hash sums are used by eDonkey2000 to restore and control the integrity of downloading and already downloaded files.
xt=urn:aich:[ aich Hash (Base32) ]
 Kazaa hash Used on FastTrack, these hash sums are vulnerable to hash collision attacks.
xt=urn:kzhash:[ Kazaa Hash (Hex) ]
 BitTorrent info hash (BTIH) These are hex-encoded SHA-1 hash sums of the "info" sections of BitTorrent metafiles as used by BitTorrent to identify downloadable files or sets of files. For backwards compatibility with existing links, clients should also support the Base32 encoded version of the hash.
xt=urn:btih:[ BitTorrent Info Hash (Hex) ]
 Some clients require Base32 of info_hash (e.g., Vuze).
 BitTorrent info hash v2 (BTMH) BitTorrent v2 replaces the obsolete SHA-1 hash with a SHA-256 info hash. The v2 info-hash is given a new prefix (btmh) to allow for torrents that can participate in both v1 and v2 swarms
xt=urn:btmh:[ BitTorrent Info Hash (Hex) ]
 Message Digest 5 (MD5) Supported by G2 (Gnutella2), such hashes are vulnerable to hash collision attacks.
xt=urn:md5:[ MD5 Hash (Hex) ]

Web links to the file 
There are two types of download links that a Magnet link can include as a direct or backup source.

 "as" ("acceptable source") Most clients treat "as" as equal to the "xs" token when it comes to priority, and ignore the timeout before contacting "as" sources denoted by the specs.
 Content-Addressable Web URL This type of -based link is used by gnutella as well as G2 applications.
xs=http://[Client Address]:[Port of client]/uri-res/N2R?[ URN containing a file hash ]
xs=http://192.0.2.27:6346/uri-res/N2R?urn:sha1:FINYVGHENTHSMNDSQQYDNLPONVBZTICF
Link to a DirectConnect hub to find sources for a file This type of link connects a DirectConnect client immediately to the hub in question.
xs=dchub://[hub address]:[hub port]
Reference to a web-based source cache for a file on Gnutella2 In this case, the included link points, not to a client IP or direct source, but to a source cache which stores the IPs of other clients contacting it to download the same file. Once a client connects to the cache, it is served IPs for alternate sources, while its own IP is stored within the cache and forwarded to the next one connecting to the cache. This system operates similar to a BitTorrent tracker.
xs=http://cache.freebase.be/[ SHA-1 hash ]
Reference to an eD2k source
xs=ed2kftp://[client address]:[client port]/[ed2k hash]/[file size]/

Supplement format (x.) 
For experimental and self-complementing informal options, the prefix  followed by a chosen suffix letter can be used.  These names are guaranteed to never be standardized.
x.[name of the new parameter]=[data of the new parameter (URL encoded)]

Clients

See also 
 BitTorrent
 Burnbit
 ed2k URI scheme
 InterPlanetary File System
 Metalink
 Named data networking
 Peer-to-peer

Explanatory notes

References

External links 
 , an early definition of the format (last update 2002)
 CHK Freeware checksum utility with SHA1-Base32 and ED2K support
 , an open source command-line tool, which can calculate magnet links

File sharing
URI schemes